Sven Lõhmus (born 13 July 1972) is an Estonian pop-composer and lyricist. He is a producer at Moonwalk Studios, a music company featuring Estonian artists.

He has worked with leading artists of Estonia, including Vanilla Ninja (of which he was also manager), Suntribe, Urban Symphony, Grete Paia, Laura Põldvere, and Getter Jaani. In 2003, 2004 and 2010 he won the award for "Best Author" from the "Eesti Popmuusika Aastaauhinnad". He was also the lead singer of two bands, Mr. Happyman and Black Velvet.

Entries in the Eurovision Song Contest
"Let's Get Loud" by Suntribe, Estonia, (Eurovision Song Contest 2005), 20th place (Semi Final)
"Rändajad" by Urban Symphony, Estonia, (Eurovision Song Contest 2009), 6th place
"Rockefeller Street" by Getter Jaani, Estonia, (Eurovision Song Contest 2011), 24th place
"Verona" by Koit Toome & Laura, Estonia, (Eurovision Song Contest 2017), 14th place (Semi Final)

References

External links
moonwalk.ee

Estonian songwriters
1972 births
Living people
Estonian record producers
20th-century Estonian composers
21st-century Estonian composers
20th-century Estonian musicians
21st-century Estonian musicians
Tallinn University alumni